Trichophysetis pygmaealis is a moth in the family Crambidae. It is found in India (Khasi Hills).

References

Cybalomiinae
Moths described in 1896
Moths of Asia